Ferguson Marine (Port Glasgow) Limited is a shipbuilding company whose yard, located in Port Glasgow on the Firth of Clyde in Scotland, was established in 1903.  It is the last remaining shipbuilder on the lower Clyde and is currently the only builder of merchant ships on the river. For some years the company's mainstay has been Roll-on/roll-off ferries, primarily for Caledonian MacBrayne (CalMac), including a series of innovative hybrid diesel-electric/battery-powered vessels. Beset with difficulties since 2018 over their latest two CalMac ferries, Fergusons' largest ever vessel, the shipyard was nationalised in December 2019. It is now classified as an executive non-departmental public body of the Scottish Government.

History
The Ferguson shipyard was founded as a partnership by four Ferguson Brothers (Peter, Daniel, Louis and Robert) who left the Fleming & Ferguson shipyard in Paisley to lease the Newark yard in Port Glasgow in March 1903. Ferguson Brothers acquired the freehold in the yard in 1907 and was incorporated as Ferguson Brothers (Port Glasgow) Ltd in 1912. The company was purchased by John Slater Ltd (Amalgamated Industries) in 1918 but returned to control of the Ferguson family in the late 1920s. Lithgows Ltd purchased an interest in the business after Bobby Ferguson's death in 1954 and took control of the Company in 1961. Ferguson Brothers remained a separate entity within the Scott Lithgow group from 1969 to 1977.

The company was nationalised and subsumed into British Shipbuilders in 1977, then merged with the Ailsa Shipbuilding Company to form Ferguson-Ailsa Ltd in 1980.

Ferguson Shipbuilders Ltd
Ferguson and Ailsa were separated in 1986 when the latter yard was sold and Ferguson was merged with Appledore Shipbuilders in Devon to form Appledore Ferguson Shipbuilders Ltd. By the late 1980s only the Appledore Ferguson yards were still held in state ownership. Ferguson was demerged from Appledore and acquired by Greenock-based engineering firm Clark Kincaid in 1989 then started trading as Ferguson Shipbuilders. 

Clark Kincaid itself was acquired by Kvaerner and became Kvaerner Kincaid in 1990, and the Ferguson yard sold to Ferguson Marine plc in 1991. The entire shareholding in Ferguson Marine was acquired by the Holland House Electrical Group in 1995. The sign above the main gate continued the name Ferguson Shipbuilders Limited. Between 2013 and 2016 the yard built three hybrid diesel-electric/battery powered ferries, beginning with Hallaig - the world's first.

Ferguson Marine Engineering Ltd.

In August 2014, the shipyard placed the company into administration and the following month Clyde Blowers Capital, an industrial company owned by Jim McColl, purchased the yard for £600,000 and renamed it Ferguson Marine Engineering Ltd (FMEL).

In August 2015, government-owned Caledonian Maritime Assets Limited (CMAL) announced that an order for two ferries for Caledonian MacBrayne service, capable of operating on either marine diesel oil or liquefied natural gas, had been won by Fergusons. Originally intended for delivery during 2018, construction difficulties (the reasons for which are in dispute) led to a two-year delay for the first ship, Glen Sannox, which was launched in November 2017.

FMEL was part of two consortia's bids for the  programme for five type 31 frigates for the Royal Navy, worth some £1.25 billion. The consortia are those led by Babcock International and Atlas Elektronik UK. After their bid was selected, a contract was formally awarded to Babcock Group on 15 November 2019, for an average production cost of £250 million per ship and an overall programme cost set to be £2 billion.

On 30 October 2018, FMEL secured a contract to construct a large air cushioned barge for Mangistau ACV Solutions Ltd, part of the CMI Offshore Ltd Group, with estimated completion scheduled in 2019. In December 2018 FMEL announced that two orders worth £5.4 million had been secured from Inverlussa Marine Services for fish farm support ships, to be completed in May 2019, and that three more for fishing vessels, totaling £11 million, were in the pipeline. By July 2019 the ferry dispute had led to delays in closing the trawler contracts.

Attempts by Clyde Blowers Capital to negotiate with the Scottish Government over increased costs and delays to ferries failed, and on 9 August 2019 the directors of FMEL gave notice that the company would be put into administration. This led to a bitter dispute between the Scottish Government and the former owners of the shipyard. A week later the Scottish Government announced that they would take over management of the yard to allow work to continue on current orders, and that if no private buyer could be found in four weeks, the yard would be nationalised by purchase. At the start of December, after three private bids to purchase the yard were rejected as being insufficiently favourable to creditors, the government formally took ownership of the shipyard, and in the process wrote off about £50 million of previous loans.

Ferguson Marine (Port Glasgow) Ltd.

The newly nationalised shipyard was renamed Ferguson Marine (Port Glasgow) Ltd. on 2 December 2019. The costs and viability of completing contracts was investigated, and Tim Hair was appointed as turnaround director. On 22 January 2020 he told a Scottish Parliament inquiry that the large ferries  and Hull 802 were "significantly less than half built", with 95% of their design still to be agreed with the client body Caledonian Maritime Assets. Additional naval architects and marine engineers had been engaged to complete this design work.

In March 2020 Ferguson Marine announced that they had taken a four year lease on a large warehouse sited at Greenock waterfront, and would use it to consolidate stock and materials which had been stored in several warehouses near Glasgow Airport. The large air cushioned barge for CMI Offshore Ltd (ordered from FMEL in 2018) was launched on 24 June 2020, to be taken to the Caspian Sea to be completed and outfitted for oil exploration work in that area.

The company's board of directors with six non–executive members, including Alistair Mackenzie as chairman, was appointed in June 2020 by the Scottish Government Cabinet Secretary Fiona Hyslop.

In February 2021, the firm announced it would take on 120 additional workers with the intention of operating seven days per week. The bulbous bow of Hull 802 was fitted in September 2021, and reported as a landmark in significant progress to both ships, deliveries of which by January 2022 were running up to five years late. 

Fergusons had bid for two new ferries to be ordered by CMAL, but was not included on the shortlist to submit detailed tenders. On 16 December David Tydeman was appointed chief executive, to take over from Tim Hair in February 2022.

List of vessels built since 2000
Ferguson Shipbuilders Ltd

Stirling Shipping Company
MV Stirling Iona (2000) (73.8 x 16.3 metres) (Offshore Supply tug)
MV Stirling Jura (2002) (73.8 x 16.3 metres) (Offshore Supply tug)
Northern Lighthouse Board
NLV Pole Star  (2000) (51.52 x 12 metres) (Medium Buoy Tender)
Caledonian Maritime Assets
    (2001) (99 x 15.8 metres) (Marine diesel ROPAX ferry)
  (2007) (54.27 x 13.9 metres) (Marine diesel Ro-Ro Ferry)
     (2013) (43.5 x 12.2 metres) (Diesel electric hybrid Ro-Ro Ferry)
   (2014) (43.5 x 12.2 metres) (Diesel electric hybrid Ro-Ro Ferry)
Western Ferries
 (2001) (50 x 15 metres) (Marine diesel Ro-Ro Ferry)
MV Sound of Shuna  (2003) (50 x 15 metres) (Marine diesel Ro-Ro Ferry)
Centre for Environment, Fisheries and Aquaculture Science
 (2003) (72.92 x 16.11 metres) (Research vessel)
Scottish Fisheries Protection Agency
FPV Minna    (2003) (47.7 x 10 metres) (Fisheries Protection)
FPV Jura     (2006) (84 X 13.1 metres) (Fisheries Protection)
Tamar Bridge and Torpoint Ferry Joint Company 
Plym II   (2004) (73 x 20.35 metres) (Ro-Ro chain ferry)
Tamar II  (2005) (73 X 20.35 metres) (Ro-Ro chain ferry)
Lynher II (2005) (73 X 20.35 metres) (Ro-Ro chain ferry)
Airbus UK
MV Arenig Fawr   (2007) (18.5 x 5 meters) (Suction Dredger)

Ferguson Marine Engineering Ltd 2014 +
Caledonian Maritime Assets
 (2016) (43.5 x 12.2 metres) (Diesel electric hybrid Ro-Ro Ferry)
 (2019) (102.4 x 17 metres) (LNG/marine diesel hybrid ROPAX Ferry)
Hull 802 (2019/20) (102.4 x 17 metres) (LNG/marine diesel hybrid ROPAX Ferry)
Mangistau ACV Solutions Ltd (part of CMI Offshore Ltd Group)
ACB argymak  (Q1 2020) (55 x 24 metres) (Air Cushion Barge)
Inverlussa Marine Services
MV Helen Rice (2019) (21 x 8.35 metres) (Aquaculture Support Vessel)
MV Kallista Helen (2020) (26.5 x 12 metres) (Aquaculture Support Vessel)

See also 
Ferry fiasco - for the Scottish political controversy around the construction of the Glen Sannox and Hull 802.

References

External links 

 

Shipbuilding companies of Scotland
Companies based in Inverclyde
River Clyde
British companies established in 1903
Manufacturing companies established in 1903
Manufacturing companies disestablished in 1977
1903 establishments in Scotland
1977 disestablishments in Scotland
Re-established companies
Manufacturing companies established in 1986
1986 establishments in Scotland
Port Glasgow
British companies established in 1986
British Shipbuilders
Executive non-departmental public bodies of the Scottish Government